Alan Mark Davis is president and CEO of Offtoa, Inc. in Westminster, Colorado. He is a retired Professor of Business Strategy and Entrepreneurship in the College of Business at the University of Colorado at Colorado Springs and in the Executive MBA program at the University of Colorado at Denver.  Davis earned his master's degree in Computer Science under Donald B. Gillies at the University of Illinois at Urbana-Champaign in 1973 and Ph.D. in Computer Science under Thomas R. Wilcox at the University of Illinois at Urbana-Champaign in 1975.  He has held academic positions at George Mason University and the University of Tennessee. He has been a visiting faculty member at University of Illinois at Urbana-Champaign, the University of the Western Cape (South Africa), the University of Technology, Sydney (Australia), and the Technical University of Madrid (Spain). He was a Fulbright Specialist at the University of Jos (Nigeria) and Atma Jaya University, Yogyakarta (Indonesia).  He has held industry positions at GTE (a Director of R&D at GTE Communication Systems in Phoenix, Arizona; and Director of the Software Technology Center at GTE Laboratories in Waltham, Massachusetts), BTG (Vice President in Vienna, Virginia), and Omni-Vista (President in Colorado Springs, Colorado). He was Editor-in-Chief of IEEE Software from 1994 to 1998 and was an editor for the Journal of Systems and Software (1987-2010) and Communications of the ACM (1981-1991) and on the editorial board of the Requirements Engineering Journal (2005-2011). He was a Fulbright Senior Specialist from 2003 through 2007. He has been an IEEE Fellow since 1994 and an IEEE Life Fellow since 2015..

Books 
Davis has written the following books. In 2006, his 201 Principles of Software Development was voted by ACM members as one of the 20 classic computer science books:

Software Requirements: Analysis and Specification (Prentice Hall 1990), .
Software Requirements: Objects, Functions and States (Prentice Hall, 1993), .
201 Principles of Software Development (McGraw Hill, 1995), .
Great Software Debates (Wiley and IEEE Computer Society Press, 2004), .
Just Enough Requirements Management (Dorset House, 2004), .
Will Your New Start Up Make Money (Scrub Oak Press, 2014), .
Unusual Africa: Traveling on the Edge (Scrub Oak Press, 2016), .
Unusual Asia: Traveling on the Edge (Scrub Oak Press, 2017), .
Unusual Latin America (and Antarctica): Traveling on the Edge (Scrub Oak Press, 2017), .

External links
 Al Davis's web page

1949 births
Living people
American computer scientists
Fellow Members of the IEEE
Stuyvesant High School alumni
Grainger College of Engineering alumni
University at Albany, SUNY alumni
University of Colorado faculty
George Mason University faculty
University of Tennessee faculty
Academic staff of the University of Jos
University of Illinois faculty
American expatriates in Nigeria
Academic staff of the University of Technology Sydney
American expatriates in Australia
American expatriates in South Africa
American expatriates in Indonesia
Academic staff of the Technical University of Madrid
American expatriates in Spain
Scientists from New York (state)